Coral Shores High School is a senior high school in Islamorada, Florida, United States, with a Tavernier postal address. It is one of the two high schools of the Monroe County School District.

History
1952 was its year of establishment.
In September 2017, Hurricane Irma temporarily disrupted operations.
 it had fewer than 800 students.

References

External links
 Coral Shores High School
 
 Article index of Coral Shores High School from CBS Miami
 

Public high schools in Florida
Education in Monroe County, Florida
1952 establishments in Florida
 Educational institutions established in 1952